Marja Kok (born 29 June 1944) is a Dutch actress and film director. In 1981 she won the Golden Calf for Best Actress award. She has appeared in more than 25 films and television shows since 1967.

Selected filmography
 In for Treatment (1979)
 Mates (1999)

References

External links

Biography at the werkteater.nl website (in Dutch)

1944 births
Living people
Dutch film directors
Actors from Rotterdam
20th-century Dutch actresses
21st-century Dutch actresses
Dutch women film directors
Golden Calf winners